Ilaria Spada (born 27 February 1981 in Latina, Latium, Italy), is an Italian actress and showgirl, born in the Pontine Marshes district to an Italian father and a Sicilian-Tunisian mother.

Spada participated as anchorwoman in Zecchino d'oro on Raiuno and Libero on Raidue, with Teo Mammucari and Elisabetta Gregoraci, and she appeared on a cover of the prestigious weekly magazine Panorama.

At the end of 2006, Spada portrayed a firefighter, participating, with Alessandro Gassman, Pietro Taricone and Antonello Fassari, at the TV show of Canale 5 Codice Rosso (Red Code). She is the first woman to portray this role. (In Italy, women have only recently been permitted to become firefighters).

Since April 2007, Spada has been a protagonist in the Raiuno TV show Provaci ancora prof 2 (Try again, Prof 2) with Veronica Pivetti (as the professor) and Enzo De Caro (as the professor's husband).

References

People from Latina, Lazio
Living people
1981 births
Italian showgirls
Italian stage actresses
Italian film actresses
Italian television actresses
Italian people of Tunisian descent